Gabriel Spahiu (born 21 March 1968) is a Romanian actor. He appeared in more than eighty films since 1998.

Spahiu was also chosen by Sony Pictures Animation to dub Wayne in the animated movies Hotel Transylvania, Hotel Transylvania 2 and Hotel Transylvania 3.

Selected filmography

References

External links 

1968 births
Living people
Romanian male film actors